Samuel Gilbert Henry Baker (2 October 1874 – 2 January 1946) was an Australian rules footballer who played with Fitzroy in the Victorian Football League (VFL).

Notes

External links 

1874 births
1946 deaths
Australian rules footballers from Victoria (Australia)
Fitzroy Football Club players